The 2000–01 Cupa României was the 63rd edition of Romania's most prestigious football cup competition.

The title was won by Dinamo București against Rocar București.

Format
The competition is an annual knockout tournament.

First round proper matches are played on the ground of the lowest ranked team, then from the second round proper the matches are played on a neutral location.

If a match is drawn after 90 minutes, the game goes into extra time, where it works golden goal rule. If the match is still tied, the result is decided by penalty kicks.

In the semi-finals, each tie is played as a two legs.

From the first edition, the teams from Divizia A entered in competition in sixteen finals, rule which remained till today.

First round proper

|colspan=3 style="background-color:#97DEFF;"|6 September 2000

|}

Second round proper

|colspan=3 style="background-color:#97DEFF;"|7 November 2000

|-
|colspan=3 style="background-color:#97DEFF;"|8 November 2000

|}

Quarter-finals 

|colspan=3 style="background-color:#97DEFF;"|29 November 2000

|-
|colspan=3 style="background-color:#97DEFF;"|30 November 2000

|}

Semi-finals
The matches were played on 4 April and 2 May 2001.

||2–2||1–3
||3–0||1–1
|}

Final

References

External links
 romaniansoccer.ro
 Official site
 The Romanian Cup on the FRF's official site

Cupa României seasons
2000–01 in Romanian football
Romania